The 2021 New York City FC season was the club's seventh season of competition and its seventh in the top tier of American soccer, Major League Soccer. New York City FC usually played its home games at Yankee Stadium in the New York City borough of The Bronx. Like the 2020 MLS season, the club also played several of their home games at Red Bull Arena in Harrison, New Jersey due to scheduling conflicts with Yankee Stadium and its backup stadium, Citi Field. New York City FC won the clubs' first MLS Cup title by defeating the Portland Timbers 2–4 in penalty shoot-outs with a 1–1 score before going into extra time, in which neither of the teams scored.

In addition to the MLS season, the club also competed in the Leagues Cup for the first time, finishing up in the quarter-finals after losing to UNAM in a penalty shoot-out.

Player movement

In

Out

Current roster

Non-competitive

Preseason

Competitive

Major League Soccer

Standings

Eastern Conference

Overall table

Results summary

Results by round

Results

MLS Cup Playoffs

U.S. Open Cup 

On July 20, US Soccer finally announced that the tournament would be cancelled for 2021 and would resume in 2022.

Leagues Cup

Statistics

Appearances and goals
Last updated on 12 December 2021

|-
! colspan=14 style=background:#dcdcdc; text-align:center|Goalkeepers

|-
! colspan=14 style=background:#dcdcdc; text-align:center|Defenders

|-
! colspan=14 style=background:#dcdcdc; text-align:center|Midfielders

                                           

|-
! colspan=14 style=background:#dcdcdc; text-align:center|Forwards

|-
|}

References

New York City FC
New York City FC
New York City FC seasons
New York City FC
MLS Cup champion seasons